Rakin or Rokin may refer to:
 Rakin, Hamadan
 Rakin, Markazi